Christmas is a 1988 compilation Christmas album released by Sparrow Records. It features CCM artists' interpretation of the best-known Christmas songs done in their genres like rock ("Jingle Bell Rock" by Geoff Moore), pop ("O Holy Night" by Steve Camp), R&B ("Silent Night" by BeBe & CeCe Winans) and even mariachi ("Winter Wonderland" by Steve Taylor). Christmas also contains an original composition called "Home for the Holidays" sung by participating artists on this album. American R&B singer Deniece Williams was nominated for a Grammy for Best Gospel Performance, Female for her rendition of "Do You Hear What I Hear" at the 31st Grammy Awards.
The album peaked at number 18 on the Billboard Top Inspirational Albums chart.

Track listing

Charts

Radio singles

References

1988 Christmas albums
Sparrow Records albums